!K7 Music is a music company based in Berlin, Germany that focuses mostly on electronic music. The name is an abbreviation of the company's original Berlin address, Kaiserdamm 7 (it has since relocated, first to Heidestrasse 52, and currently headquartered at Gerichtstrasse 35). !K7 has since opened branch offices in New York City and London. The company now operates an artist management division, managing a roster of artists including the British musician Tricky. !K7 Music also runs a successful Label Services and Synch and Licensing department.

It has five independent imprints as part of the K7 label group: !K7 Records, !7K, Strut, AUS and Soul Bank.

K7 had a licensing deal with the New York-based indie label Frenchkiss Records. It has distributed the labels AGOGO, District 6, Environ, Get Physical, Ghostly International, Lo Recordings, Moshi Moshi Records, Piranha, R2, Skint, Salt Records and Muthas of Invention. It also has a music publishing company. It currently distributes Turbo Recordings, Sonar Kollektiv, Luaka Bop, and Rushhour, among others.

History 
Stud!o K7 has produced electronic music artists, especially for the DJ-Kicks compilations. It began in 1985 with the idea of releasing digital video clips. In 1991, the first of the 3LUX series (three volumes) was released, followed by the X-Mix series (from 1993 to 1998). In 1995, the DJ-Kicks series was released. At that time it was unconventional to play complete albums with DJ cuts on home stereos. Artists such as Kruder & Dorfmeister, Nightmares On Wax, Thievery Corporation and Stereo MC's Chromeo, Booka Shade contributed to its release. The compilation series has since included mixes from Jackmaster, Seth Troxler, Marcel Dettmann, Michael Mayer, DJ Koze, Nina Kraviz, Daniel Avery and John Talabot.

In 1996, !K7 started launching artist albums. As of 2014 the !K7 discography features albums from artists such as Kruder & Dorfmeister, Matthew Herbert, Dani Siciliano, Ursula Rucker, Swayzak, and Boozoo Bajou. In 2001, Rapster Records, a new subsidiary of !K7, started focusing on urban, soul and hip-hop music. Since then, Rapster has released records by DJ Jazzy Jeff, Pete Rock, and Roy Ayers, among others. Rapster also forged an alliance with UK-based soul aficionado Peter Adarkwah, head of BBE Records. !K7 founded another subsidiary, Ever Records, in 2006, for indie bands and singer-songwriters such as Cortney Tidwell, Cyann & Ben, and Howie Beck. In 2008 Strut Records & Gold Dust Media joined the !K7 label group.  Between 1999 and 2003 Strut released Nigerian Afrobeats, Leftfield Discos, Rare Groove and Grandmaster Flash's latest album. Strut's founder, Quinton Scott, is responsible for A&R. In 2013 !K7 started a cooperation with Tricky for releases on his label, including his 2013 album False Idols.

In May 2017, !K7 created a subsidiary focused on Contemporary music, producing artists such as Niklas Paschburg, Hior Chronik, Echo Collective, Henrik Schwarz, Luca D’Alberto, Maike Zazie and Martyn Heyne.

In October 2017, !K7 acquired the catalogues of Patrice Rushen, Miriam Makeba and The Beginning of the End from Warner Music Group, as part of the major's divestments after acquiring Parlophone as a result of the sale and break-up of EMI.

Artists  

 John Acquaviva
 The Beginning of the End
 Mykki Blanco 
 Boozoo Bajou
 Brandt Brauer Frick
 James Alexander Bright
 Circlesquare
 da damn phreak noize phunk
 Erol Alkan
 Digitalism
 Chris de Luca
 Sean Deason
 Benjamin Diamond
 Vikter Duplaix
 Michael Fakesch
 Fehlfarben
 Five Deez
 Funkstörung
 Ghost Cauldron
 The Glimmers
 A Guy Called Gerald
 The Herbaliser
 Herbert
 Beth Hirsch
 Nick Holder
 Interstellar
 K-Hand
 Khao
 Koop
 Kruder & Dorfmeister
 Mike Ladd
 Ladytron
 Life Force
 Miriam Makeba
 Milosh
 Nicolette
 Out Hud
 Erlend Øye
 Terrence Parker
 Peace Orchestra
 Playgroup
 Princess Superstar
 Stacey Pullen
 Quiet Village
 Rae & Christian
 Ursula Rucker
 Patrice Rushen
 Henrik Schwarz
 Ian Simmonds
 James Sims
 Shantel
 Dani Siciliano
 Smith & Mighty
 Spacek
 Stateless
 Stereotyp
 Swayzak
 Terranova
 Tosca
 Tricky
 Trüby Trio
 Gez Varley
 Goose
 Voom:Voom
 Wamdue Kids
 When Saints Go Machine
 Earl Zinger
 Bjarki
 Red Axes
 Reto A Ichi
 Tomat Petrella
 Bochum Welt
 Hundred Waters
 Sandunes
 Michael Mayer

See also 
 List of record labels
 List of electronic music record labels

References

External links 
 Official site
 Studio !K7 at Discogs

Record labels established in 1996
German independent record labels
Electronic dance music record labels
Electronic music record labels